Robin Kimberly Anderson (born April 12, 1993) is an American tennis player.

Career
She received a wildcard into the main draw of the 2022 Australian Open on her Grand Slam debut, after winning the USTA's Australian Open Wildcard Challenge.

Personal life
Anderson's parents are Denom and Trudy Anderson, and she has two siblings, Matthew and Samantha.

College
Anderson attended UCLA from 2011 to 2015, where she was on the tennis team each year. She won the Honda Sports Award as the nation's best collegiate female tennis player in 2014, and earned the award as well in the following year, 2015.

Grand Slam singles performance timeline

WTA 125 tournament finals

Singles: 1 (runner-up)

ITF Circuit finals

Singles: 13 (5 titles, 8 runner–ups)

Doubles: 16 (8 titles, 8 runner–ups)

Notes

References

External links
 
 

1993 births
Living people
American female tennis players
African-American female tennis players
Tennis people from New Jersey
21st-century African-American sportspeople
21st-century African-American women
UCLA Bruins women's tennis players